Javier Jose Mendoza (born 1978) is a conductor who most recently has served as the music director of the Chicago Arts Orchestra.

Mendoza did his undergraduate studies in music at Butler University, and received his Master of Music degree from the University of New Mexico.  While in New Mexico, he was apprentice conductor to Roger Melone, Resident Conductor of the New Mexico Symphony Orchestra.

Mendoza is an advocate for the cause of community music within the Latin American community.

External links
Chicago Arts Orchestra official site

American male conductors (music)
1978 births
Living people
American musicians of Mexican descent
21st-century American conductors (music)
21st-century American male musicians
Hispanic and Latino American musicians